Love Is Forever may refer to:

 Love Is Forever (1982 film), a TV movie starring Michael Landon
 Love Is Forever (1954 film), a West German drama film
 "Love Is Forever" (Billy Ocean song), 1986
 "Love Is Forever" (Leonora song), 2019 song that represented Denmark in the Eurovision Song Contest 2019
 "Love Is Forever" (Tomoko Kawase song), 2003
 "Neutron Star Collision (Love Is Forever)", a 2010 song by Muse
 "Love Is Forever", a 1995 Italian Eurodance song by Bliss Team
 Love Is Forever (Cliff Richard album), 1965
 Love Is Forever (Biff Bang Pow! album), 1988